Deane Waretini (born c. 1946) is a musician from New Zealand. He had a #1 chart hit in 1981 with the song "The Bridge", a Māori language song set to Nini Rosso's tune "Il Silenzio". He is also the son of a historically significant Maori baritone singer and recording artist. In later years, Waretini was featured in a New Zealand television production that was built around him.

Background
He was born Adrian Waretini in Rotorua in 1946, the youngest son of famed Maori singer Deane Waretini Snr. Waretini really only found out about his father's singing when he was aged about 12. It wasn't until years later that he knew about his father having recorded on to record. To him, his father just worked as a laborer and would sing lullabies. Music wasn't really a big thing in their home in Horuhoru. By the time he was in his late teens he had moved from Rotorua to Christchurch and was working as a labourer. It was in 1967 that his father died. Young Waretini was 21 at this time. It wasn't until about two years after his father's death that he would actually get to hold one of his records in his bands.

Career
At age 14, and having learnt a few chords on the guitar, and apparently enough to impress the opposite sex,  he tried out for a band. After being made to realize that he didn't own a guitar, the option left was singing.  Having learnt a few songs from the radio, he joined a local group called the Tremloes.  After 18 months of rehearsing, the band got their chance to play at a venue called the Ritz. With a capability to handle 600 patrons, the Ritz was nearly empty. On their debut there, the band were taken off stage. While the other members were upset over this action, Waretini apparently philosophical about the event, was happy just to have played there. After that, Waretini was finding work and doing gigs where the opportunity arose.

By 1967 he was the father of two children. A day short of his 21st birthday, he learnt that his father had died. He was in Christchurch at this time. After the funeral of his father, Waretini was taken under the wing of his cousin George Tait, a Te Arawa elder. Tait also became his manager. In 1970, Tait flew Waretini to Australia, and financed the trip himself from his war pension income. While Waretini was there, he came across Wi Wharekura who had previously been a musician with the Howard Morrison Quartet.
After learning a few things about the business, Waretini came back and joined the roster of promoter Joe Brown. Waretini really began his professional career in the early 1970s. Around that time he appeared as a finalist in Studio One's New Faces Contest. Also around that time, he cut his first record "Troubles In My Life". The debut single was released on the Tony McCarthy Recordings label, a small label that previously had released a recording by Mahia Blackmore.

In June 1973, he entered a contest to pick the song for the 1974 Commonwealth Games. The song "Baby I'm Leaving" was a Mark Anthony composition. Other artists in the competition were The Rumour with "Quiet Song", an Anderson & Wise composition, and "Join Together", by Steve Allen. Allen's song was the winner. In an earlier heat, another singer with the same surname, Andy Waretini had entered with the song "Last Year's Summer".

"The Bridge"
The Bridge was originally self-released before CBS picked it up. After that it became the first no 1 song to be sung in Maori language. It stayed at the top of the charts for two weeks.

It was recorded in a garage in the Auckland suburb of Henderson. Waretini didn't have money to pay the musicians so he paid them in Kentucky Fried Chicken. Spending $96 to get a pile of the singles produced, he sent some to Radio 1ZB, then bombarded them with play requests. He managed to get it played at Auckland's Civic Theatre as part of their intermission music. He also recruited a news paper boy to sell copies to passing people for 50 cents each. This soon resulted in people going into record shops looking for it. Not long afterwards, CBS wanted to put it out. On 3 April 1981, the song pushed John Lennon's Woman from the number 1 spot.  It also reached no 7 in Australia.

For his efforts he received $27,000 from CBS and surrendered the rights to the song.

Post "The Bridge"
In 1981, along with Ken Kincaid, the Lightwood family, and Rhonda, he appeared on the Mauri Hikitia album, which was in support of the Mt. Smart Stadium project. In 1984, he released the single "Te ariki, Oh Lord". An article about the single called "Deane needs a hit to bridge over his debts" appeared in the 22 February edition of the Auckland Star.

In 2012, Waretini was the subject of a seven-part television series called Now is the Hour,  shown on Maori television. Also in 2012, his album Now is the Hour spent 2 weeks in the New Zealand charts and peaked at no 25.

Song For Anna
At some stage he recorded a song called "Song For Anna", which was a tribute to victims of domestic violence who have died as a result of the act.

Discography

Television

References 

New Zealand Māori male singers
20th-century New Zealand male singers
Living people
1940s births
Māori-language singers